Jannabi (stylized in all caps or JANNABI) is a South Korean indie rock band that was formed in 2012 and debuted in 2014 under the independent record label Peponi Music, whose core membership consisted of vocalist Choi Jung-hoon and guitarist Kim Do-hyung. Originally a quintet, the band has undergone several lineup changes, with Choi and Kim remaining the only constant members since its inception. Currently, the duo expanded to include session musicians. They are recognized for their live performances and self-produced songs infused with Korean lyricism. Though their sound has diversified throughout their career, their music is characterized by a fusion of pop, classical music elements and nostalgic overtones. Their songwriting, often inspired by personal experiences and literature, mostly focus on themes of youth and coming of age.

Jannabi achieved critical and commercial success in 2019 with their album Legend which along with its hit single "For Lovers Who Hesitate," reached number one on the Circle Digital Chart, received platinum certifications for both streaming and download in South Korea and won two Korean Music Awards. Praised for breaking new ground in the 2019 Korean popular music scene that is almost dominated by idol groups, the band has since become one of the most prominent rock groups in their native country, experiencing consistent commercial success on the music charts, concerts and festivals.

Jannabi has released a total of three studio albums, three extended plays and one reissue thus far, three of which have peaked in the top ten of the Circle Album Chart. They accumulated nineteen songs on the Circle Digital Chart and nine songs on the Billboard K-pop Hot 100. Their other accolades include a Golden Disc Award, KBS Entertainment Award, Melon Music Award, Seoul Music Award and two MAMA Awards.

Name 

The group's name, Jannabi, is an archaic Korean word for monkey and the band was originally composed of neighborhood friends from Bundang who were all born in 1992, the Year of the Monkey in the Chinese zodiac. According to Choi Jung-hoon, the name was suggested by their close friend. They introduce themselves as a "group sound" rather than a band. The term was used to refer to a band in the Korean music scene in the 1960s and 1970s, signifying the group's desire to restore the classics of the band's music.

History

Before 2012-2015: Early years and albums

School days

Choi Jung-hoon and Jang Kyung-joon both went to Bundang Elementary School and knew each other since then. After they both entered Seohyun Middle School, they played instruments in club activities. Choi heard about guitarist Kim Do-hyung through a video of Kim's self-composed song that left a good impression on Choi. Therefore, Kim joined the two during senior year of high school, performing at their neighborhood Bundang Central Park for school activities and events.

After graduation, Choi and Jang studied in different colleges while Kim did not. At the same time, they were in a hurry looking for contract with big entertainment companies. Kim and Jang joined Yanghwajin Band (양화진) of CAN Entertainment and disbanded in the next year. Choi became a trainee at FNC Entertainment. However, he eventually left the agency after realizing his creativity was restricted by the company rules and he had different music taste from N.Flying.

Formation and Superstar K5

Kim Do-hyung knew keyboardist Yoo Young-hyun through the recommendation of his friend and introduced him after to Choi Jung-hoon.

Choi Jung-hoon, Kim Do-hyung and Yoo Young-hyun decided to form a rock band called Jannabi alongside the establishment of the independent label Peponi Music headed by Choi's older brother in 2012. They honed their skills by performing over 70 club live performances and busking over 100 times on the streets of Hongdae and Insa-dong.

To increase more awareness, Jannabi auditioned for Superstar K5 on August 16, 2013. While Kim and Yoo were eliminated, they encouraged Choi who would like to be eliminated with them instead of partaking as a member of new formed vocalist group Plan B (플랜비), to finish the show. In the end, Plan B was eliminated in the Top 7 qualifying round.

Fortunately, Jannabi met producer and songwriter Shinsadong Tiger through the song production of Plan B. After Superstar K5, Jannabi who was worried about their debut album, asked S. Tiger for advice from a K-pop perspective. Expecting that they would be given a song, S. Tiger said, "You don't need such a thing. I can't touch you." S. Tiger's support fostered Jannabi and set up their styles.

Debut
On April 28, 2014, Jannabi released their debut single album Rocket produced by S. Tiger. The song was firstly titled Love and performed in GOGOS 2 underground club in 2013. Rocket was originally scheduled to be released on April 18. However, on April 16, two days before the release, the Sewol ferry disaster happened. Jannabi and S. Tiger, expressing deep condolences to the victims, decided to delay the release of the song. Rocket is a self-composed song by the members, combining folk rock and reggae beats. In particular, the song changes into a variety of genres, creating a unique feeling through playing of brass and piano in a jazz style.

On August 3, 2014, Jannabi was recognized for their skills by being selected as the Penta Super Rookie of the 2014 Pentaport Rock Festival which gave them the chance to perform live on Moonlight Stage for the first time. On August 28, Jannabi released their second single album Pole Dance which included two tracks, "Pole Dance" and "Baby I Need You."

On October 29, 2014, Jannabi released their third single album November Rain followed by their second mini solo concert at Club Ta in Hongdae on November 7. On November 8, Jannabi participated as one of the Top 10 finalists for Hongdae Street Song Festival in celebration of Joy News 24's 10th anniversary.

On December 16, 2014, Jannabi released their first EP See Your Eyes. The lead single "See Your Eyes" was dedicated to a woman who has been hurt by the wrong way of love, expressing a man's regret over his irresponsible behavior.

New members and Korean drama soundtracks 
Bassist Jang Kyung-joon and drummer Yoon Kyul joined the group in 2015. Jang Kyung-joon, who has long been a cameo member in Jannabi, became an official member through the band's love call. Yoon Kyul, a talented drummer majoring in drums in college, joined Jannabi through an audition. In the same year, Jannabi started participating in original soundtracks for Korean television dramas including Let's Eat 2, Ex-Girlfriends' Club, and Second 20s with their own compositions.

On May 23, 2015, Jannabi was selected as Rookie Green Friends and entered the final lineup of the 2015 Green Plugged Seoul Festival. In cooperation with Naver Musician League, the festival conducted a competition among emerging bands and musicians through online support voting and final offline contest held at the Lotte Card Art Center Art Hall on April 20.

On July 4, 2015, Jannabi held their fourth mini solo concert "Fire" at Rolling Hall in Hongdae.

On November 25, 2015, Jannabi held their fifth mini solo concert "Change" at Hyundai Card Understage in Itaewon.

2016-2018: First studio album and rising popularity

Monkey Hotel
On May 21, 2016, Jannabi released "Wonderful" and "Beautiful" as Dear My Friends original soundtracks. In addition, Jannabi released "Can I Laugh?" as Drinking Solo original soundtrack on September 19. Jannabi was nicknamed "tvN civil servants" for working on the OST of most tvN dramas, from Let's Eat 2 to Drinking Solo.

On June 1, 2016, EXID lead single "L.I.E (Jannabi Remix)" was released.

On June 18, 2016, Jannabi held their sixth solo concert "Monkey Hotel" to celebrate the release of its first full-length album of the same name on August 4. The album contains ten self-composed songs, including the title song "Summer." It was postponed several times because they did a lot of trial and error in recording for the first time in a studio.

On October 11, 2016, Jannabi appeared on MBC's special TV show DMC Festival that attracted public attention, ranking first on Naver real-time search for the first time.

On December 18, 2016, Jannabi held their seventh solo concert "Jannabi and the New World" in an all-standing manner. The year-end concert was sold out within five seconds after ticket selling opened, taking the first place in the indie section's reservation rate with a market share of 39.8%.

She (Hidden Track No.V-1) and various broadcasts
On January 5, 2017, "Yoon Jong-shin X Jannabi" was broadcast live on Naver VLIVE channel Hidden Track No.V, a platform where known artists collaborate with attractive singers whom they wanted to recommend to the public every month. Choi Jung-hoon said the reason why Jannabi was picked as the first month cast of the show in 2017 was because of their hard work in Naver Musician League since spring in 2014. He said, "We just kept posting videos in the Musician League in order to do well, but then we went up to the Best League, and then we climbed to the Top 100 and there was even a good opportunity called Hidden Track No.V." On January 24, Jannabi with Yoon Jong-shin held a mini concert "Live to unlock Yoon Jong-shin X Jannabi" at  Hyundai Card Understage, engaging 300 audiences with simultaneous broadcast on Naver VLIVE.

On February 18, 2017, Jannabi had their first appearance on You Hee-yeol's Sketchbook. You Hee-yeol praised them, stating: "Jannabi is my flavor among recent bands...If I went back to my twenties, I would be a member of Jannabi." In the same month, Jannabi participated in the recording of Yoon Jong-shin's episode of Immortal Songs: Singing the Legend for the first time.

On June 15 and 16, 2017, Jannabi held their eighth solo concert "Stop, look and listen" at Samsung Hall of Ewha Womans University which was sold out in just two minutes. According to Interpark tickets, it ranked first in the indie category in terms of reservation rate with a market share of 50.5%. As such, media outlets called Jannabi "band idols." The concert was held under the concept "abandoned opera house" as suggested by Choi. They performed a total of 26 songs in 150 minutes and mobilized 1,400 people.

On August 29, 2017, Jannabi's new digital single "She," which was first performed at "Live to unlock Yoon Jong-shin X Jannabi," was announced to be released on September 9. Choi said, "I hope it will be a song for all the 'shes' we love or who love us."

On December 30 and 31, 2017, Jannabi held their ninth solo concert "Jannabi Fantastic Old-Fashioned." The year-end concert was sold out, taking the first place in the indie section's reservation rate with a market share of 38.2%.

Good Boy Twist and collaborations

On April 16, 2018, Jannabi's official Instagram announced that the band would release a compilation album Monkey Hotel Special Edition by uploading the cover image of their 2016 album Monkey Hotel. The album included unreleased demo songs and a special lyric book.

On August 13, 2018, Jannabi released the digital single "Good Boy Twist." Choi Jung-hoon, who created the song, delivered a profound message in a pleasant rhythm. He said, "If you do not keep pace with the fast-moving trend of the times, you will be thrown out of business. It is not just a matter of technology and fashion. All the values that you have learned to be right so far, and that you held and ran vigorously in your arms, are overturned in an instant, and there is no need to embrace them anymore. It's not just me and my friends that it has become an illusion."

Jannabi actively collaborated with excellent artists in 2018. The first was "Lilac (feat. Choi Jung-hoon of Jannabi)" from Changmo extended play The Moment of Contact, and the second was "On the Path (Feat. Jannabi, Kim Yoon-hee)" from Lee Moon-sae sixteenth studio album Between Us.

On December 21, 2018, Jannabi released the digital single "Made in Christmas" featuring Lee Su-hyun of AKMU. The song was the 1980s synth pop with female vocals. The collaboration attracted the public attention and the song soon entered Melon real-time chart Top 100.

2019-2021: Breakthrough success and lineup changes

Legend and first nationwide concert tour

On January 25, 2019, Jannabi released their seventh digital single "Like When We First Met," remaking Yoon Jong-shin's song.

On February 3, 2019, Jannabi released "Take My Hand" as part of the Romance Is a Bonus Book original soundtrack.

Jannabi has created an unprecedented sensation when they released their second studio album Legend on March 13, 2019. Reflecting on the meaning of the album's title, Choi stated that it tells the story of a young person’s hardships that will itself one day only remain a legend. He describes it further by saying "When I look back when I got older, I hope I can say, 'We also had a legendary youth.'" 

The album's lead single "For Lovers Who Hesitate" gained huge popularity, sweeping music charts in South Korea dominated by K-pop idols with retro music. Choi as the lyricist of the song, emphasized a love that could have been and a hopeful note to not let love slip away in the future. He shared, "This is the lead track of our second full-length album, written for lovers who hesitate. Not all love lasts forever regardless of how genuine it was. However, that won't stop people from loving and being loved." On the morning of April 19, 2019, it was reported that the song ranked number one in real time charts including Billboard K-pop 100 and Gaon Digital Chart, beating out "Boy with Luv" by BTS. The song remained on the charts long after its release, surpassed 100 million streams and reached 2.5 million downloads on Gaon Music Chart, earning Platinum certifications from the Korea Music Content Association (KMCA). The success of the album also made their old songs such as "November Rain" (2014), "Baby I Need You" (2014), "Summer" (2016), and "She" (2017) climb several music charts. With the unexpected mainstream success, Choi said that the group's only goal is to make better music. During a 2019 interview with The Hankyoreh, he said, "I wanted to think of chart rankings as if nothing had ever happened. It wasn't what I was aiming for. It's about making better music. If more people like it, it becomes a driving force for us to make better music."

From March 16 to April 13, 2019, Jannabi held their first national tour concert "Together" to a sold-out crowd of 7,600 fans.

Controversies and Young-hyun's departure 

Following Jannabi's rise to fame, the members became subject of controversies. On May 24, 2019, keyboardist Yoo Young-hyun voluntarily left the band after he admitted to reports of him being a bully during his school years. The following day, Choi Jung-hoon was accused of participating in the management of a company run by his father, who is under investigation for fraud. Peponi Music denied the allegations and expressed that they would take legal action against those who spread groundless rumors on Choi. The prosecution later stated that an investigation on Choi was not necessary. Choi posted a personal statement on Instagram to apologize for Young-hyun's school violence controversy and clarify the false reports about him. The netizen who spread false information about Choi was later fined  million in total by the Suwon District Court for defamation. Peponi Music added that the company was filing additional separate criminal complaints against those who have posted malicious comments and continue to spread false information about him and the band.

Concerts and awards 

From August 31 to September 1, 2019, Jannabi held their two-day concert "Jannabi Fantastic Old-Fashioned Returns!" at the Olympic Hall in Olympic Park, Seoul to a sold-out crowd of 6,000 fans, performing more than 30 songs.

By the end of 2019 and beginning of 2020, Jannabi attended various Korean music award shows. They won the Top 10 Artist at the Melon Music Awards, Best Band Performance at the Mnet Asian Music Awards, V Live Discover, and Best Digital Song (Bonsang) at the Golden Disc Awards. Jannabi has been nominated for five categories at the Korean Music Awards 2020, including Album of the Year, Best Modern Rock Album, and Artist of the Year; and won the Song of the Year (Daesang) and Best Modern Rock Song. On the band's musical style, Music Critic Jung Min-jae of KMA writes:

Jannabi embarked on their second nationwide concert tour "Nonsense II" beginning February 2020 to a sold-out 20,000 seats right after the ticket selling was opened. While they were able to perform at the Olympic Hall, Seoul on February 15 to 16 and Kim Daejung Convention Center, Gwangju on February 22, the Daegu, Busan and Chuncheon dates were cancelled due to the COVID-19 pandemic. The band and its fan club later donated for the citizens and medical staff at COVID-19 screening centers in Daegu.

Jannabi's Small Pieces 1 and military enlistment of members

On June 23, 2020, Peponi Music announced that Jang Kyung-joon would take a break after news that he is getting married in August 2020 was subject to a backlash from fans online and to prepare himself for the upcoming military enlistment.

On November 6, 2020, Choi and Kim continued to record as a duo and released Jannabi's second EP Jannabi's Small Pieces I with the title song "A thought on an autumn night." The title track ranked first on various music charts in South Korea such as Bugs, Genie and Vibe.

On January 16, 2021, Kim Do-hyung announced through his Instagram that he would be enlisting for his mandatory military service on January 26, 2021.

On March 14, 2021, Jannabi released "After a tumultuous night" as Drama Stage's Love Spoiler original soundtrack.

The Land of Fantasy and Yoon Kyul's departure

With two of the members, Jang and Kim, being on a hiatus due to military service, Choi has continued to promote the band with session musicians. On July 28, 2021, Jannabi released their third studio album The Land of Fantasy: Captain Giorbo & Old-Fashioned Heroes and its lead single "I Know Where The Rainbow has Fallen." All thirteen tracks were written by Choi with the help of Kim in the production of the album prior his military enlistment. The album topped weekly album charts and entered the Top 10 bestselling albums of Gaon Album Chart in South Korea upon release. South Korean online magazine Tonplein named The Land of Fantasy as  "The Best Album of 2021" and "The Best Rock Album of 2021." The album was also nominated for the "Best Modern Rock Album" in 2022 by the Korean Music Awards.

On August 31, 2021, Peponi Music announced that Jannabi Fantastic Old-Fashioned Returns! x Nonsense II will be shown at 50 CGV Cinemas nationwide for three weeks starting on September 9, 2021. The 140-minute film features live performances and behind-the-scenes of Jannabi's 2019 and 2020 concerts of the same titles. Pre-orders for the tickets on September 2, 2021 quickly reached number one in the booking rate among the CGV screenings right after it was opened. During the movie screenings, the band also set a record of 91 stage greetings, considered as the highest number in the history of domestic cinema, to be able meet the fans.

On October 29, 2021, Jannabi participated in the 25th anniversary tribute for punk rock band No Brain by remaking their song "Midnight Music," track from No Brain's 5th album That is Youth (2007).

On November 24, 2021, Peponi Music announced that drummer Yoon Kyul's contract ended before serving as a social worker and was performing as a guest until his termination, following reports of him assaulting a woman.

On December 12, 2021, Jannabi won the Best Band Performance title at the 2021 Mnet Asian Music Awards for their song "A Thought on an Autumn Night." Choi alongside session musicians performed the said song and "I Know Where The Rainbow has Fallen" at the CJ ENM Contents World in Paju, South Korea.

2022–present: Comeback

Jannabi's Small Pieces 2: Grippin' the Green

On April 25, 2022, Choi announced the band's May comeback EP and possible concerts through handwritten letter to fans. The EP name Jannabi's small pieces II: GRIPPIN'THEGREEN was unveiled alongside the image of the cover on May 1 via the band's official social media accounts. Jannabi shared visual and audio snippets of the tracks from May 2 to 6, respectively. On May 10, the EP and its lead single "GRIPPIN'THEGREEN" was released. It ranked first on the Bugs and quickly entered the Top 100 of Genie and Melon real-time music charts. In addition, all the songs on the EP, including "LADYBIRD," "summerfallwinter sprinG." and "ASTEARSGOBY," settled at the top of the Bugs chart. Choi revealed that the EP was filled with "songs made at home, in the afternoon, while looking out the window," with Choi hoping that listeners would listen to the EP like that as well.

Festivals and Fantastic Old-fashioned End of the Year Party! tour

Jannabi took over more than 10 university festivals in South Korea for the entire year, starting May and steadily received love calls from September to October. In addition to college festivals, the band performed as headliner of numerous music festivals including the Beautiful Mint Life 2022, 2022 Seongnam Park Concert which drew more than 30,000 spectators, Someday Festival and 2022 Joy Olpark Festival; and subheadliner of the Incheon Pentaport Rock Festival, Chilpo Jazz Festival, Busan International Rock Festival and Gyeonggi Indie Music Festival.

On July 10, 2022, Jannabi released "Look At You!" as With the Silk of Dohpo Flying original soundtrack.

On July 27, 2022, following the discharge of Kim Do-hyung, Jannabi performed at the "K-Indie Music Night" that was held at Damrosch Park, an outdoor venue at the Lincoln Center for the Performing Arts in New York City, United States, with 2,500 seats filled up. Considered as the band's first international stage, the concert was presented by the Korean Cultural Center New York as part of Lincoln Center's “Summer for the City.”

On September 23, 2022, Choi appeared as an original singer on the seventh season of Hidden Singer. The show's sixth episode introduced Jannabi as "the first place in festival recruitment." The episode ranked first in the same time slot and Choi took sixth place in the overall ranking of entertainment performers. The band's representative songs, particularly those featured during the broadcast, have re-entered various music charts.

On September 26, 2022, a song collaboration "Because We Loved" by Choi and Kang Min-kyung was released. The song ranked first on various music charts such as Bugs and Genie. The following day, a promotional song "Drop The Beat" by Jannabi was released for the Buskers World Cup in Gwangju.

Jannabi held their third national concert tour, Fantastic Old-fashioned End of the Year Party! from early November 2022 to the end of January 2023. They toured Busan, Gwangju, Seoul, Incheon, Daegu, Suwon, Chuncheon and Cheonan, performing 20 times. The opening shows in Busan were sold out within 3 minutes as soon as the tickets went on sale on October 4 while Seoul performances had 160,000 waiting numbers, causing strain on the server at one time due to the unprecedented heavy influx of site traffic. The concert recorded a sold out procession and was attended by 50,000 people for about three months.

In January 2023, Jannabi starred on JTBC's Begin Again - Intermission.

Artistry

Musical style and development 

The band's music has been described as indie rock, folk, pop rock, chamber pop and art rock with incisive lyrics and songwriting style suitable for easy listening. They incorporated the nuances of the roots of Korean popular music originally called gayo, classical music elements and pop in innovative ways. When the members were asked to define the band's music, they shared, "Sound that comes from your parents' car." Choi described that their music represents a lot of Korean sentiment.

Jannabi has been praised for its lyrically wistful, vintage-pop artistry that appeals to people across all generations. Music critic Kim Yoon-ha described them as, "A retro band that revives old feelings with a band sound." Korean Cultural Center New York writes:

Their repertoire expanded to include a broad variety of music styles with their third full-length album The Land of Fantasy (2021). Music critics described it as an album that revealed the "virtues that rock music of the past has sought after," resembling an opera or musical drama while embedding progressive rock's ambition to become more colorful and grander. The album with a storyline, explored music styles such as baroque pop and rock opera. Music critic Park Hyun-joon praised the "harmonious arrangement of 13 songs organized like a concept album" that unfolds the band's image who ends their twenties in a majestic aspect and showcases their "complete musical freedom" from the success of previous works.

With a high-energy performance style and vivacious frontman Choi, Jannabi have grown their audience since their breakout year in 2019. The band is highly requested at universities and multiple music festivals in South Korea, including DMZ Peace Train Music Festival, Jisan Valley Rock Festival, Pentaport Rock Festival and Busan Rock Festival.

Songwriting and lyrics 

At their outset in 2014, Jannabi's songs were the product of Choi Jung-hoon, Kim Do-hyung and Yoo Young-hyun's collaborative songwriting. In the following years, Choi became the sole lyricist of the band while the members continued to share official credit on the composition and arrangement of their music.

The band's lyrical content and composition tended to be classical, introspective and poetically oriented. Some of the cited poets by Choi included Emily Dickinson, Wisława Szymborska, Charles Baudelaire and Choi Seung-ja. Among the example of songs which drew inspiration from a poem was "I Know Where The Rainbow has Fallen," in which the lyrics 'lonely island romantic' was quoted from Jeong Ji-yong's poem entitled "News of May." Other themes of their music include romance, friendship, community, self-awareness and fictional narratives.

Influences 

The atmosphere of pop music from previous generations was deeply ingrained in Jannabi's songs. The band was heavily influenced by various artists from different eras, including Simon & Garfunkel in the '60s; The Beatles and Queen in the '70s; and Sanulrim, Oasis and Blur in the '90s. In 2021, they made the song "A Ballad of Non Le Jon" to express their long admiration to The Beatles. Other early influences include The Moody Blues, The Beach Boys, Procol Harum, Led Zeppelin, Elton John, Kim Kwang-seok and Yoo Jae-ha. In a 2017 interview with The Korea Herald, Choi said, "It's really funny that we've always been in love with everything from the 1960s and '70s, the times we haven't even lived in. We can just feel the time's vibes, fashion, music and lifestyle. It had a huge impact on our music, as well as on our daily lives."

Members

Current members
 Choi Jung-hoon (최정훈) – lead vocals, acoustic guitar, keyboards, percussion, synthesizer (2012–present)
 Kim Do-hyung (김도형) – lead and rhythm guitar, percussion, backing vocals (2012–present)

Former members
 Yoo Young-hyun (유영현) – keyboards (2012-2019)
 Yoon Kyul (윤결) – drums (2015-2021)
 Jang Kyung-joon (장경준) – bass guitar, backing vocals (2015–2022)

Current session musicians
 Moon Seok-min (문석민) – lead and rhythm guitar (2021–present)
 Lee Jun-kyu (이준규) – bass guitar (2022–present)
 Shin Isaac (신이삭) – drums (2017–present)
 Jeong Ha Eun (정하은) – keyboards (2021–present)
 Kwak Jin-Seok (곽진석)– percussion (2022–present)
 RuRu, RaRa (루루, 라라) – chorus (2022–present)

Former session musicians
 Park Cheon-wook (박천욱) – bass guitar (2020-2022)
 Harmonize (하모나이즈) - choir (2019-2021)

Other ventures

Endorsement

In May 2019, Jannabi was chosen as the model for Lotte e-commerce's digital video advertisements. The campaign is for customers in their 20s who enjoy sharing information and content. In October 2019, Jannabi was selected as the first Korean artist to be the brand ambassador for sound equipment manufacturer Fender.

In 2022, the band's songs from their third studio album The Land of Fantasy (2021) were featured in the advertisements of various high-end brands. The first was "Bluebird, Spread your wings!" for Google Play released in June 2022 and the second was "Summer II" for iPhone 14 Pro by Apple Inc. released in October 2022.

In 2023, the band's song "Oh Brave Morning Sun" was used as background music for the advertisement of Korea's leading ginseng brand Cheong Kwan Jang.

Philanthropy

In November 2019, Jannabi donated their college festival fee to the development fund of Kyung Hee University, Choi's alma mater.

In March 2020, following the cancellation of their second concert tour "Nonsense II" due to the COVID-19 pandemic, Jannabi donated masks to the locals of Daegu. The fans were inspired and donated their concert refunds to the same beneficiaries and the locality's screening centers.

In May 2022, Jannabi donated the entire amount of their college festival fee for the students of Kyung Hee University. In September 2022, Jannabi, who appeared at the Chilpo Jazz Festival, donated  to Pohang for relief and recovery efforts after the city was hit by Typhoon Hinnamnor.

Discography

Studio albums

Extended plays

Singles

Soundtrack appearances

Other charted songs

Other album appearances

Filmography

Films

Music videos

Television series

Television shows

Concerts and tours

Headlining

Tour
 Together (2019)
 Nonsense II (2020)
 Fantastic Old-fashioned End of the Year Party! (2022-2023)

Festivals
 Beautiful Mint Life (2022) 
 Sang Sang Festival (2022)   
 Someday Festival (2022) 
 Joy Olpark Festival (2022)

Concert participation
 Seongnam Park Concert (2019)
 K-Indie Music Night (2022)
 Seongnam Park Concert (2022)

Awards and nominations

Year-end lists

Notes

References

External links
 Jannabi on YouTube
 Jannabi on Naver
 
 
 

South Korean indie rock groups
South Korean rock music groups
Musical groups established in 2012
2012 establishments in South Korea